Elena Nikolayevna Georgievskaya (b. June 9, 1980 in Yaroslavl Oblast, USSR) is a Russian author and political activist. Georgievskaya is a non-binary person and uses they/them pronouns.

They graduated from the Maxim Gorky Literature Institute in 2006. They also studied at the Herzen University (1999–2000) and at the Faculty of Philosophy of the Saint Petersburg State University (2000–2001).
They are a member of the Union of Russian Writers (since 2012).

They were longlisted for the Debut Prize (2006, 2013, 2015).
They are a recipient of a Khavinson Grant (2006).
They are a recipient of the 2010 Fellowship of the Ministry of Culture.
They live in Kaliningrad and Moscow.

They are the author of books including «Вода и ветер» (Вагриус, 2009), «Хаим Мендл» (Franc-tireur USA, 2011), «Книга 0» (Franc-tireur USA, 2012), «Сталелитейные осы» (Вивернариум, 2017).
Olga Slavnikova praised their early novel «Место для шага вперёд».

References

External links
 Official site (in Russian)
  Debut Prize official site (in Russian)
  Новая карта русской литературы (in Russian)
 http://articulationproject.net/елена-георгиевская (in Russian)
Interviews
 Елена Георгиевская: “Я люблю понятные” (2010)
 Писатель Елена Георгиевская: «Я себя чувствую больше человеком, чем женщиной» (2012)

1980 births
Living people
People from Myshkinsky District
Russian feminists
Russian women's rights activists